Flight 401 may refer to:

Iberia Airlines Flight 401, crashed on 5 May 1965
Eastern Air Lines Flight 401, crashed on 29 December 1972

0401